Astra Hungary FC, a.k.a. Astra-Bíró-Kert for sponsorship reasons, is a Hungarian women's football club from Budapest competing in the Hungarian 1st Division. 

Founded as Íris SC, the team moved to Taksony in 2008 as Taksony SE but returned in 2011 to Budapest, taking its current name. Its best results to date are two third spots (1999, 2011) and a national cup's final (2004) lost to László Kórház SC.

2022–23 Squad

References

Football clubs in Budapest
Women's football clubs in Hungary
1990 establishments in Hungary